Nike Kornecki (born August 18, 1982) is an Israeli Olympic sailor, and competes in the 470 Class double-handed monohull planing dinghy with a centerboard, Bermuda rig, and center sheeting.
  In 2004, she won a bronze medal in the world championships in the 470.

Biography
Kornecki is Jewish, and was born in Italy.

Sailing career
In 2000, she partnered with Vered Buskila, and in 2001 they won a bronze medal at the European Championships in Ireland.  In 2004, they won bronze medals in both the European Championship in Germany and the 470 World Championship in Zadar, Croatia.

They competed on behalf of Israel at the 2004 Summer Olympics in Athens, Greece, in the Women's 470 Class Two-Person Dinghy, and came in 18th.  They won a silver medal in the 2005 European Championship.

They competed on behalf of Israel at the 2008 Summer Olympics in Beijing, China, in the Women's 470 Class Two-Person Dinghy, and came in fourth.

References

External links
 
 
 

1982 births
Living people
Israeli female sailors (sport)
Italian female sailors (sport)
Olympic sailors of Israel
Sailors at the 2004 Summer Olympics – 470
Sailors at the 2008 Summer Olympics – 470
Jewish sailors (sport)
Israeli Jews
21st-century Italian Jews